The Latin Patriarchate of Jerusalem is an Exemption (church) diocese of the Roman Catholic Church. The patriarchate contains 64 parishes. The Patriarchate embraces territorial Israel (without territorial expansion after 1967), Jordan, the Palestinian territories, the Israeli administered territories in the West Bank, and Cyprus. (The Golan is not part of the patriarchate.)

Distribution of parishes by areas

The 64 parishes with 78,000 Catholics and 85 diocesan priests (as of 2010) are classified according to four areas of the diocese. These are in alphabetical order:

 Israel (excluding Jerusalem), for which an episcopal vicar in Nazareth is ordered.
 Jerusalem and the Palestinian territories directly into the jurisdiction of the Patriarch.
 Jordan, for an episcopal vicar in Amman is appointed.
 Cyprus, for an episcopal vicar in Nicosia is ordered.

The parish places and chaplaincies follow the instructions of the Latin Patriarchate.

Parishes and chaplaincies with church buildings and chapels

See also
 
 
Chapel of Our Lady of Sion

External links
 http://en.lpj.org/the-diocese/the-parishes/

Catholic Church in Cyprus
Catholic Church in Israel
Catholic Church in Jordan
Catholic Church in the State of Palestine